Diyos at Bayan is a Philippine television public affairs show broadcast by Light TV. Hosted by Eddie Villanueva, it premiered on August 21, 1998.

The show was broadcast by RPN from 1998 to 2001 and 2002 to 2005 and by NBN from 2001 to 2002.

Diyos at Bayan concluded on June 3, 2019 on GMA Network (from 2006) and GMA News TV (from 2011; formerly QTV from 2005–2011 and currently GTV since 2021), due to the termination of the blocktime agreement between GMA Network/Citynet Network Marketing and Productions and ZOE Broadcasting Network on April 24, 2019, which took effect on June 4. On December 12, 2021, the program returned to its original home on Channel 11, this time through A2Z which is a partnership between ZOE TV and ABS-CBN. At the same time, the program is reformatted as a virtual public affairs talk show.

Hosts
 Bro. Eddie Villanueva 
 Kata Inocencio 
 Alex Tinsay 
 Carlo Lorenzo 
 K. A. Antonio 
 Cel de Guzman 
 Stanley Clyde Flores

References

External links
 
 

1998 Philippine television series debuts
1990s Philippine television series
2000s Philippine television series
2010s Philippine television series
2020s Philippine television series
Filipino-language television shows
GMA Network original programming
GMA News TV original programming
People's Television Network original programming
Philippine religious television series
Radio Philippines Network original programming
Light TV original programming